The APA Award for Distinguished Professional Contributions to Applied Research (until 2003 known as the Award for Distinguished Professional Contributions to Knowledge) is a scientific award presented by the American Psychological Association "to a psychologist whose research has led to important discoveries or developments in the field of applied psychology."

The 1997 award to John E. Exner raised a controversy, as it was seen as granting a professional endorsement to the Rorschach test, seen by some as pseudoscience.

List of recipients
Source: American Psychological Association

1979 Sol L. Garfield, Leopold Bellak, Harry Levinson
1980 Leonard D. Eron
1981 Carl Eisdorfer
1982 Roy Schafer
1983 Neal E. Miller
1984 Norman Frederiksen
1985 Albert Ellis
1986 Edward Zigler
1987 Mary D. S. Ainsworth, Hans H. Strupp
1988 Herman Feifel
1989 Allen E. Bergin
1990 Manfred J. Meier
1991 W. Grant Dahlstrom, Joseph Matarazzo
1992 Leopold Bellak, Harry Levinson
1993 Paul E. Meehl
1994 John L. Holland
1995 Kenneth I. Howard, Lester B. Luborsky
1996 Paul Satz
1997 John E. Exner, Samuel M. Turner
1998/1999 Peter E. Nathan
2000 Simon H. Budman
2001 Marvin R. Goldfried
2002 John D. Krumboltz
2003 Theodore Millon, Stanley Sue
2004 Robert J. Gatchel
2005 Gail S. Goodman
2006 Stephen M. Weiss
2007 Bruce E. Wampold
2008 Richard Rogers
2009 Luciano L'Abate
2010 Catherine E. Lord
2011 Ronald F. Levant
2012 Leslie S. Greenberg
2013 Richard M. Fox
2014 J. Thomas Grisso
2015 Leonard A. Jason
2016 No award
2017 Cameron J. Camp
2018 Gary W. Harper
2019 David C. Schwebel
2020 Nancy E. Betz

See also
 List of psychology awards

References

American psychology awards
American Psychological Association
Awards established in 1979